

Ripstop fabrics are woven fabrics, often made of nylon, using a reinforcing technique that makes them more resistant to tearing and ripping. During weaving, stronger (and often thicker) reinforcement yarns are interwoven at regular intervals in a crosshatch pattern. The intervals are typically 5 to 8 millimeters (0.2 to 0.3 in). Thin and lightweight ripstop fabrics have a 2-dimensional structure due to the thicker yarns being interwoven in thinner cloth. Older lightweight ripstop fabrics display the thicker interlocking thread patterns in the material quite prominently, but more modern weaving techniques make the ripstop threads less obvious. A similar effect can be achieved by weaving two or three fine yarns together at smaller intervals.

Advantages of ripstop are the favourable strength-to-weight ratio and that small tears can not easily spread. Fibers used to make ripstop include cotton, silk, polyester, and polypropylene, with nylon content often limited to the crosshatched threads that make it tear-resistant.

Applications

Ripstop fabrics are used in yacht sails and spinnakers, hot air balloons, wingsuits , kites, free-flight models, parachutes, and  hovercraft skirts. High-quality camping equipment such as lightweight tents, sleeping bags, and camping hammocks tend to use ripstop in order to reduce the wear on their fabrics which are in direct contact with the ground or the wind. Swags, flags, banners, and other applications requiring a strong lightweight fabric use ripstop too. Ripstop reinforcements are incorporated into heavier fabrics requiring extreme durability, such as those used in Army Combat Uniforms, Nomex protective clothing for firefighters and other workwear, Brazilian jiu-jitsu uniforms, outdoor and sports clothing, backpacks, and luggage bags. Self-adhesive ripstop patches are used to repair both rips and tears in other fabrics.

Ejection seat parachutes made with ripstop are woven with an elastic-like fabric so that they stretch to allow more air to pass through at high speed. Then as the ejection seat slows, the weave closes and acts like a conventional parachute. This allows the pilot seat to slow gently, avoiding compression that could result in spinal injury.

Ripstop nylon

Ripstop nylon is a light-weight nylon fabric with interwoven ripstop reinforcement threads in a crosshatch pattern. The material comes in many different colors, sizes, and thicknesses. It is woven with coarse, strong warp and filling yarns at intervals so that tears will not spread.

Ripstop nylon may be waterproof, water resistant, fire resistant, or have zero porosity (will not allow air or water through), and comes in light, medium and heavy weights. Textures range from a soft and silk-like material to a crisp or stiff fabric that sounds like a paper bag when moved.

Nylon was developed in World War II as a replacement for silk in the production of parachutes.

See also
 Ballistic nylon
 Cordura
 Rip-stop doubler, a crack arrestor in structural engineering, using the same principle of reinforcement

References

Woven fabrics